Yuumi is a Japanese feminine given name. It is distinct from the Japanese given name Yumi, which has a short "u".

It may be written:

 With two kanji, one read  and another read  (e.g. )
 With two kanji, one read  and another read  (e.g )
 In hiragana

People with this name include:

 , Japanese model who represented Japan at Miss Universe 2018
 , Japanese model and actress
 , Japanese actress
 , Japanese singer, former member of SGO48

Fictional characters with this name include:
 Yuumi, the Magical Cat, a League of Legends character voiced in English by Cassandra Lee Morris

References

Japanese feminine given names